The following is a list of cities and towns in the Neumark, Germany, as used until 1945.

This article is a translation of the German Wikipedia's Liste der Städte in der Neumark article.

See also
List of placenames in the Province of Pomerania
List of German exonyms for places in Poland

20th century in Brandenburg
Neumark, cities and towns
 
Neu